Philippin is a surname derived from Philipp. Notable people with the surname include:

 Jules Philippin (1818–1882), Swiss politician 
 Sybille Philippin (born 1970), German mezzo-soprano